Maran is a federal constituency in Maran District, Pahang, Malaysia, that has been represented in the Dewan Rakyat since 1974.

The federal constituency was created in the 1974 redistribution and is mandated to return a single member to the Dewan Rakyat under the first past the post voting system.

Demographics 
https://live.chinapress.com.my/ge15/parliament/PAHANG

History

Polling districts 
According to the federal gazette issued on 30 October 2022, the Maran constituency is divided into 33 polling districts.

Representation history

State constituency

Current state assembly members

Local governments

Election results

References

Pahang federal constituencies